Ark Walworth Academy is a co-educational secondary school and sixth form located in the Walworth area of London, England.

History
The school has its origins in Mina Road School which opened during the Victorian era. Pupils included Albert Edward McKenzie who won the Victoria Cross.

Walworth School was established in 1946 as an ‘experimental’ or ‘interim’ comprehensive school.

Academy
The school converted to an Ark academy for the 2007-08 academic year.

This school is split up into three sections named after notable local figures: Chaplin, Babbage and Seacole. The Chaplin and Babbage blocks are two separate halves of Key Stage 3. Key Stage 4 is known as Seacole.

The Ofsted report of July 2010 rated it as "Good, with outstanding capacity to improve".

See also
 Southwark Schools' Learning Partnership

Notes and references

Academies in the London Borough of Southwark
Secondary schools in the London Borough of Southwark
Ark schools